Milford station is a commuter rail stop in Milford, Connecticut, on the Metro-North Railroad's New Haven Line and CTrail's Shore Line East.

History
The station opened on December 25, 1848.

Shore Line East service at the station was suspended indefinitely on March 16, 2020, due to the coronavirus pandemic.

Station layout
The station has two high-level side platforms. The northern platform, adjacent to Track 1, is four cars long and generally used by westbound trains. The southern platform, adjacent to Track 4, is 10 cars long and generally used by eastbound trains. The New Haven Line has three tracks at this location. The inner track, not adjacent to either platform, is used only by express trains. Milford is the only station on the New Haven Line with only three tracks.

The station has 676 parking spaces, 444 of which are owned by the state.

Bibliography

References

External links

Station House and eastbound platform from Google Maps Street View
Westbound platform from Google Maps Street View
http://www.ct.gov/dot/lib/dot/documents/dpt/1_Station_Inspection_Summary_Report.pdf

Metro-North Railroad stations in Connecticut
Shore Line East stations
Stations on the Northeast Corridor
Stations along New York, New Haven and Hartford Railroad lines
Buildings and structures in Milford, Connecticut
Railroad stations in New Haven County, Connecticut
Railway stations in the United States opened in 1848
Transportation in New Haven County, Connecticut